Dickson Lake is a lake located north of Great Central Lake in Newcastle Land District, British Columbia.  Robert Brown in 1864 on the Vancouver Island Exploring Expedition named the lake after Dr. James Dickson.

References

Alberni Valley
Lakes of Vancouver Island
Newcastle Land District